Kade Michael Munday (born 4 January 1983) is an Australian cricketer who has played for Tasmania and an Australian rules footballer who played for the Tasmanian Football League club Burnie Dockers.

Born in Burnie, Tasmania, Munday starred as a right-handed batsman in Tasmanian junior cricket and was selected for the Australia Under-19 cricket team training squad for the 2002 ICC Under-19 World Cup, but did not play for the side. He played one List A match for Tasmania, against South Australia on 21 January 2001, scoring one run.

In football, Munday plays on the wing and is a 200-game veteran and co-captain of the Burnie Dockers Football Club. He has also represented Tasmania many times.

See also
 List of Tasmanian representative cricketers

References

External links

1983 births
Living people
Australian cricketers
Tasmania cricketers
People from Burnie, Tasmania
Cricketers from Tasmania
Burnie Dockers Football Club players
Australian rules footballers from Tasmania